Scarborough College is a private coeducational day and boarding school aged 3–18 years in Scarborough, North Yorkshire, England. It was founded in 1898 and opened in 1901. The school has been an International Baccalaureate (IB) World School since June 2006, offering it at sixth form in place of A-levels.

History 
The foundation stone for Scarborough College was laid in 1898, and the school opened on 18 September 1901. The building was designed by Edwin Cooper and later became Grade II listed. By 1907, the school had 70 boys. Following the German Navy's Raid on Scarborough, Hartlepool and Whitby in December 1914, the headmaster decided Scarborough was too unsafe for pupils so the school evacuated to Park Hotel, Keswick for a year. During World War II, pupils were evacuated to Marske Hall, Swaledale, from 1940 to 1946. The Royal Air Force (RAF) commandeered the school site and used it as the base of No. 17 Initial Training Wing, which provided basic training in aircraft mechanics, navigation, meteorology, drill, and physical fitness. Among the trainees who graduated No. 17 ITW was Michael Beetham, later Chief of the Air Staff during the Falklands War.

A considerable fire took place at the school on 10 October 1961, burning down the library and cupola, which were both rebuilt. In 1972, the school became coeducational, accepting girls for the first time. The first two girls to attend the school were Lindsey Grimstone and Vanessa Gibbon. In 2000, Lisvane Prep School moved from Sandybed Lane to the main school site on Filey Road. The school adopted the International Baccalaureate in place of A-levels in 2006. In 2012, Scarborough College and local prep school Bramcote School merged, and Lisvane was renamed to Bramcote. The outgoing head of Bramcote School, Dan Davey, became the new headmaster of Bramcote Junior School.

Pre-School and Prep school
Scarborough College's Prep School was moved on to the main campus of the college on Filey Road in 2002. It is currently housed in a modern, purpose-built building, separate from the college's historic main building. The Prep School was formerly known as Lisvane, but was renamed Scarborough College Junior School in 2010. In 2012, the college merged with local preparatory school Bramcote, and was renamed as Bramcote Junior School. The head of the prep school is Chris Barker.

The Pre-School, known locally also as Little Owls, is based in part of the new purpose-built building for the Prep school. However, in 2014 it moved to the old premises of Bramcote School across the road. Little Owls is currently led by Jackie Hunter.

Senior school and sixth form 
The senior school is housed in the college's main building. The campus also consists of a separate Science and ICT block, a sports hall, astroturf and performing arts theatre. Pupils study a mix of GCSE and IGCSE qualifications in Years 10 and 11. Classes are taught in well equipped classrooms and there are a wide range of sport, ICT, music and drama facilities.

For the sixth form there is the provision of a study centre, private ICT facilities and a separate dining area and cafe. The current Head of Sixth Form is Heather Ramsay.

List of headteachers

Notable former pupils

David Byas, cricketer
Ian Carmichael, actor
Nigel Cumberland, author
Simon Dennis, cricketer
Richard Doughty, cricketer
Chris Gilbert, cricketer
Richard Gilbert, cricketer
Richard Harrison, RAF Air Vice-Marshal
Robert Hastie, Artistic director of Sheffield Theatres
John Hick,  philosopher of religion and theologian 
Bentley Collingwood Hilliam, musician and comedian
Carolyn Hodgson, television presenter, Calendar
Robert Holtby, Anglican priest and author
Richard Hurndall, actor
Liz Jadav, actor
Charles Laughton, actor and director
Phillip Mann, science fiction author
Frazer Maude, Sky News, north of England correspondent.
Mark Precious, Olympic Bronze Medalist in Field Hockey
Senna Proctor, racing driver
Wilf Proudfoot, former Member of Parliament and businessman
Graham Farrow, playwright, screenwriter
Dr James Stephenson, astrobiologist at NASA
Ken Webster, hypnotist and performer

References

Citations

Sources

External links
Official website
Scarborough College Academic Results
International Baccalaureate

Schools in Scarborough, North Yorkshire
Private schools in North Yorkshire
International Baccalaureate schools in England